Edith Marie Flanigen (born January 28, 1929) is a noted American chemist, known for her work on synthesis of emeralds, and later zeolites for molecular sieves at Union Carbide.

Early life and education
Edith Marie Flanigen was born January 28, 1929, in Buffalo, New York. She and her two sisters, Joan and Jane, were introduced to chemistry by their high school teacher. The three sisters all went on to study chemistry at D'Youville College. Edith Flanigen graduated class president and valedictorian. Joan and Edith both went on to receive master's degrees in chemistry in inorganic physical chemistry at Syracuse University in 1952. In 2008, Syracuse awarded her an honorary doctorate.

Career 
In 1952, Edith Flanigen joined the Union Carbide company. Her job at first was the identification, purification and extraction of different silicone polymers. In 1956, she moved to the molecular sieves group. In 1973, she was the first woman at Union Carbide to be named corporate research fellow, and in 1986, senior corporate research fellow. She was moved to UOP (a joint venture between Union Carbide and Allied Signal) in 1988, where she was named senior research fellow. Flanigen was promoted to UOP Fellow in 1991. Edith Flanigen retired from UOP 1994. Following her career at UOP, and through at least 2004, Edith Flanigen remained active professionally, including as a consultant with UOP.

In her 42-year career associated with Union Carbide, Edith Flanigen invented more than 200 different synthetic substances, authored or co-authored over 36 publications, and was awarded at least 109 patents.

Chemistry

In 1956 Flanigen began working on molecular sieves. Molecular sieves are crystal compounds with molecular sized pores that can filter or separate very complex substances. Edith Flanigen is best known as the inventor of zeolite Y, a specific molecular sieve. Zeolite Y was a certain type of molecular sieve that could refine petroleum. Zeolite Y surpassed Zeolite X before it. When refining "crude oil", or petroleum, it must be separated into all of its different parts, or fractions. Gasoline is one of the many fractions that come from refining petroleum. Flanigen's zeolites are used as catalysts, or a substance that enhances chemical reactions. Zeolite Y is a catalyst that enhances the amount of gasoline fractioned from petroleum, making refining petroleum safer and more productive.

In addition to her work on molecular sieves, Flanigen also co-invented a synthetic emerald, which Union Carbide produced and sold for many years. The emeralds were used mainly in masers (predecessors to lasers) and were even used in jewelry for a time, in a line marketed as the "Quintessa Collection."

Honors and awards
Flanigen has been the recipient of many awards and honors. She was, for example, the first female recipient of the Perkin Medal in 1992. She was also inducted into the National Inventors Hall of Fame in 2004.

In 2014, the Edith Flanigen Award was created by the Collaborative Research Centre at Humboldt University of Berlin. The award is to be given annually to an outstanding female scientist at the early stage of her career. The first award was given to Natacha Krins for her work at the University of Paris.

In 2012, Flanigen was named recipient of the National Medal of Technology and Innovation. On November 20, 2014, President Barack Obama presented Flanigen with the National Medal of Technology and Innovation for her contributions to science.

Awards
1991 Chemical Pioneer Award from the American Institute of Chemists
1992 Perkin Medal  - Edith M. Flanigen was the first female recipient of the prestigious Perkin Medal.
1993 Garvan Medal 
2004 National Inventors Hall of Fame
2004 Lemelson–MIT Lifetime Achievement Award
2012 Edith M. Flanigen Honeywell invitational lecture in material science series, inaugurated October 2012
2012 National Medal of Technology and Innovation

See also
 Timeline of women in science

Notes

References 

 

1929 births
Living people
20th-century American inventors
21st-century American chemists
Women inventors
Lemelson–MIT Prize
Syracuse University alumni
Recipients of the Garvan–Olin Medal
American women chemists
Members of the United States National Academy of Engineering
D'Youville College alumni
21st-century American women scientists